Liza is primarily a feminine given name. It is sometimes used as a nickname for Elizabeth, Eliza and Luiza.

People with the name Liza include:

Given name

 Liza Andriyani (born 1979), Indonesian tennis player
 Liza Anne, American folk musician
 Liza Arzamasova (born 1995), Russian actress
 Liza Bagrationi (born 1974), Georgian singer
 Liza Balkan, Canadian actress
 Liza Béar, American filmmaker
 Liza Berggren (born 1986), Swedish model
 Liza Brönner (born 1989), Afrikaans singer and songwriter
 Liza Burgess (born 1964), Welsh rugby union player
 Liza Campbell (born 1959), Scottish artist, calligrapher, columnist and writer
 Liza Chasin, American film producer
 Liza Cody (born 1944), English novelist
 Liza Colón-Zayas (born c. 1972), American actress and playwright
 Liza Dalby (born 1950), American anthropologist
 Liza Diño (born 1983), Filipino government official, former beauty pageant winner and actress
 Liza Donnelly, American cartoonist and writer
 Liza Echeverría (born 1972), Mexican actress, model and television presenter
 Liza Essers, art gallery owner
 Liza Featherstone (born 1969), American journalist
 Liza Ferschtman (born 1979), Dutch violinist
 Liza Fior (born 1962), British architect
 Liza Fromer (born 1970), Canadian television host
 Liza Frulla (born 1949), Canadian politician
 Liza Goddard (born 1950), British actress
 Liza Grobler (born 1974), South African Mixed Media artist
 Liza Harvey (born 1966), Australian politician
 Liza Helder (born 1989), Aruban model and beauty pageant titleholder
 Liza Huber (born 1975), American television actress
 Liza Hunter-Galvan (born 1969), New Zealand runner
 Liza Jacqueline a voice actress has work for 4Kids Entertainment
 Liza Johnson (born 1970), American film director, producer, and writer
 Liza Kennedy (born 1989), Japanese model
 Liza Kisteneva (born 1998), Russian chess player
 Liza Koshy (born 1996), American YouTuber and actress
 Liza Figueroa Kravinsky (born 1962), American composer, filmmaker, and actress
 Liza Lapira (born 1981), American actress
 Liza Lehmann (1862–1918), English operatic soprano and composer
 Liza Levy, American activist
 Liza Li (born 1988), German singer
 Liza Lim (born 1966), Australian composer
 Liza Loop, technology pioneer
 Liza Lorena (born 1949), Filipino actress
 Liza Lou (born 1969), American visual artist
 Liza Manili (born 1986), French actress and singer
 Liza Marklund (born 1962), Swedish journalist and crime writer
 Liza Maza (born 1957), Filipino activist
 Liza Minnelli (born 1946), American actress and singer
 Liza Monroy (born 1979), American novelist
 Liza Morozova (Born 1973), Russian artist
 Liza Morrow, American actress
 Liza van der Most (born 1993), Dutch footballer
 Liza del Mundo (born 1975), Filipino-American voice actress
 Liza Mundy, American journalist and non-fiction writer
 Liza M. Ortiz (born 1974), Puerto Rican politician
 Liza Jessie Peterson, American playwright, actor, activist, and educator
 Liza Parker (born 1980), English badminton player
 Liza Picard (1927–2022), English historian
 Liza Potvin, Canadian novelist
 Liza Pulman (born 1969), British singer and actress
 Liza Elly Purnamasari (born 1991), Indonesian presenter, model and beauty pageant titleholder
 Liza Quin (born 1982), Cuban-American artist
 Liza Rachetto (born 1974), American racing cyclist
 Liza Redfield (1924–2018), American conductor, pianist, and composer
 Liza Richardson, American music supervisor and DJ
 Liza Fernández Rodríguez (born 1973), Puerto Rican attorney and politician
 Liza Ryan (born 1965), American visual artist
 Liza Sadovy, British actress
 Liza del Sierra (born 1985), French pornographic actress, film director and producer
 Liza Snyder (born 1968), American actress
 Liza Soberano (born 1998), Filipino-American actress and model
 Liza Sylvestre (born 1983), American visual artist
 Liza Tarbuck (born 1964), British actress and television presenter
 Liza Umarova (born 1965), Chechen singer and actress
 Liza Vorfi (1924–2011), Albanian stage actress and singer
 Liza Walker (born 1972), English actress
 Liza Wang (born 1947), Hong Kong opera singer
 Liza Weil (born 1977), American actress
 Liza Wieland (born 1960), American novelist
 Liza Witt, member of Australian pop group Teen Queens
 Liza Wright, American politician

Surname

 Sania Sultana Liza, Bangladeshi singer

Fictional people

 Liza Colby, character in the American soap opera, All My Children
 Liza Miller, character in the American television series, Younger
 Liza Moon, character in the English soap opera, Eastenders
 Liza Ortiz, character in the American television series, Fear the Walking Dead
 Liza Walton Sentell, character on American soap opera, Search for Tomorrow
 Liza Snow, a character in the video game, Far Cry 3
Liza, one of the two Gym Leaders in Pokémon Ruby & Sapphire's Mossdeep City Gym, along with Tate

English feminine given names
Albanian feminine given names